In four-dimensional Euclidean geometry, the bitruncated tesseractic honeycomb is a uniform  space-filling tessellation (or honeycomb) in Euclidean 4-space. It is constructed by a bitruncation of a tesseractic honeycomb. It is also called a cantic quarter tesseractic honeycomb from its q2{4,3,3,4} construction.

Other names 
 Bitruncated tesseractic tetracomb (batitit)

Related honeycombs

See also 
Regular and uniform honeycombs in 4-space:
Tesseractic honeycomb
Demitesseractic honeycomb
24-cell honeycomb
Truncated 24-cell honeycomb
Snub 24-cell honeycomb
 5-cell honeycomb
 Truncated 5-cell honeycomb
 Omnitruncated 5-cell honeycomb

Notes

References 
 Kaleidoscopes: Selected Writings of H. S. M. Coxeter, edited by F. Arthur Sherk, Peter McMullen, Anthony C. Thompson, Asia Ivic Weiss, Wiley-Interscience Publication, 1995,  
 (Paper 24) H.S.M. Coxeter, Regular and Semi-Regular Polytopes III, [Math. Zeit. 200 (1988) 3-45] See p318 
 George Olshevsky, Uniform Panoploid Tetracombs, Manuscript (2006) (Complete list of 11 convex uniform tilings, 28 convex uniform honeycombs, and 143 convex uniform tetracombs)
  x3x3x *b3o *b3o, x3x3x *b3o4o, o3x3o *b3x4o, o4x3x3o4o - batitit - O92
 

5-polytopes
Honeycombs (geometry)
Bitruncated tilings